Enolmis desidella is a moth of the family Scythrididae. It was described by Julius Lederer in 1855. It is found in Saudi Arabia, Syria, Lebanon, Turkey, Libya, Mauritania, Crete, Cyprus and Croatia, Slovenia, Serbia, Bosnia and Herzegovina, North Macedonia and Greece.

References

Scythrididae
Moths described in 1855